Posyolok otdeleniya 1 sovkhoza AMO is a rural locality (settlement) in Amovskoye Rural Settlement, Novoanninsky District, Volgograd Oblast, Russia. Its population was 98 as of 2010. It has four streets.

Geography 
The settlement is located in steppe on the Khopyorsko-Buzulukskaya Plain, 35 km southeast of Novoanninsky (the district's administrative centre) by road. Burnatsky is the nearest rural locality.

References 

Rural localities in Novoanninsky District